Richland Christian Church is a historic Disciples of Christ church located at Kingdom City, Callaway County, Missouri.  It was built in 1873, and is a one-story, rectangular, three bay, frame building with Italianate style design elements.  It has a front gable roof and rests on eight stone piers.  Also on the property is a contributing outhouse.

It was listed on the National Register of Historic Places in 2001.

References 

Christian Church (Disciples of Christ) congregations
Churches on the National Register of Historic Places in Missouri
Italianate architecture in Missouri
Churches completed in 1873
Buildings and structures in Callaway County, Missouri
National Register of Historic Places in Callaway County, Missouri
Italianate church buildings in the United States